f(x) is a South Korean girl group formed by SM Entertainment in 2009. Their debut "LA chA TA" was released on September 1. They also released their first physical single, "Chu~♡", on November 9.

On May 14, 2010, the group released their first EP, NU ABO with the title track as the lead single. They promoted the single "Mr Boogie" as a follow-up single from their EP.

They released their first full-length studio album Pinocchio in April 2011 with the title track as the lead single. In June 2011 Pinocchio was re-released under the title "Hot Summer" with three previously released digital singles and the title track as the lead single.

The group released their second EP Electric Shock on June 10, 2012. On July 29, 2013 the group released their second full-length studio album Pink Tape with the lead single "Rum Pum Pum Pum".

The group released their third full-length studio album Red Light, on July 7, 2014. In August 2015, it was announced that Sulli had officially left the group to focus on acting. The remaining four members continued as a group, releasing their fourth studio album, 4 Walls, on October 27, 2015.

0-9

A

B

C

D

E

F

G

H

I

J

K

L

M

N

O

P

R

S

T

U

V

W

X

Y

Z

References

F(x)